The  is the head department of the Imperial Household Agency of Japan.

History 
The origins of the structure of the Imperial Household can be traced back to the reign of Emperor Monmu, with the organisation of the government structure in 701 AD.

Prince Naruhito, in May 2004, criticized the then-grand steward, Toshio Yuasa, for putting pressure on Masako Owada, Naruhito's wife, to bear a male child. At a press conference, Naruhito said that his wife had "completely exhausted herself" trying to adapt to royal life, and added "there were developments that denied Masako's career (up to our marriage) as well as her personality".

Organisation 

The secretariat is composed of these divisions:

 Secretariat
 General Affairs
 Imperial Princes' Household Affairs
 Accounting
 Supplies
 Hospital of the Imperial Household

Grand stewards

References

External links
 Imperial Household Agency | Grand Steward's Secretariat
 Japan Ministry of Foreign Affairs (MOFA),  "Statement by the Grand Steward of the Imperial Household". 1 December 2001.

Imperial Household Agency

ja:宮内庁長官官房